Deinophloeus is a small genus of beetles in the family Laemophloeidae restricted to the New World, where five species are known to occur from Arizona south to Panama. Members of the genus are rather large for the family, ranging from about 2.5 mm to more than 4 mm in length. Members of the genus are characterized by the absence of a frontoclypeal suture, closed procoxal cavities and, in the male, elongate mandibles, clypeal horns, and modified elytral apices. The immature stages are unknown, and nothing is known about their habits or habitats.

The genus contains the following species:

 Deinophloeus ducalis Sharp
 Deinophloeus hirsutus Thomas
 Deinophloeus impressifrons (Schaeffer)
 Deinophloeus sheilae Thomas
 Deinophloeus sinuatus Sharp

References

Laemophloeidae
Cucujoidea genera